The Sharon Conglomerate is a geologic formation of early Pennsylvanian age in Pennsylvania, Ohio, and Maryland, in the United States.  It is dominantly conglomerate and quartzarenite sandstone.  In places it is abundantly crossbedded.

The Sharon Conglomerate is generally considered a Member of the Pottsville Formation in Pennsylvania and Maryland, but it is a Formation in Ohio.

Exposures
The Sharon conglomerate has no formal type section, although it is named after the town of Sharon, Pennsylvania.

One excellent exposure is located in Cuyahoga Valley National Park at "the Ledges," located southeast of the town of Peninsula, Ohio.  Another exposure is at Mary Campbell Cave near Cuyahoga Falls.

References

Pennsylvanian North America